The TU8G (ТУ8Г) is a Soviet, later Russian diesel locomotive for track gauge .

History

The diesel locomotive TU8G is designed for loading and unloading and also general purpose locomotive for Narrow gauge railways. The TU8G was developed in 1987 - 1988 at the Kambarka Engineering Works to replace the aging locomotive classes TU6D. The TU8G was designed to be used on any gauge from  – . The cab is equipped with heat-system, refrigerator, radio-set and air conditioning.

Additional specifications
 Carrying capacity of motor-car platform - 
 Crane - hydraulic with moving remote control
 Carrying capacity - 
 Angle of rotation (of crane) - 360°
 Max. boom-out (of crane) - 
 Number of seats in the cabin - 6
 Distance between bogies - 
 Base of bogies -

See also
Kambarka Engineering Works
Narrow gauge railways

References

External links

 Series locomotives (Russian language)
 TU8G diesel locomotive (Russian language)

750 mm gauge locomotives
Diesel locomotives of the Soviet Union
Diesel locomotives of Russia
Diesel locomotives of Ukraine
3 ft 6 in gauge locomotives